Thomas Lowndes may refer to:
Thomas Lowndes (astronomer) (1692–1748), British astronomer
Thomas Lowndes (congressman) (1766–1843), U.S. congressman from South Carolina